Five ships of the Royal Navy have been named Sharpshooter (or Sharp Shooter).

  was a 12-gun brig launched in 1805. She was sold in 1816.
  was an iron screw gunvessel launched in 1846. She was sold in 1869.
  was a torpedo gunboat launched in 1888. In 1912 she was renamed  and reduced to harbour service. Sold in 1922 and broken up.
  was an  launched in 1917 and scrapped in 1927.
  was a  launched in 1936. Converted to a survey ship and renamed Shackleton in 1953 she was scrapped in 1965. 

Royal Navy ship names